Fisalia was the name of at least two ships of the Italian Navy and may refer to:

 , a  launched in 1912 and discarded in 1918.
 , an  launched in 1931 and sunk in 1941.

Italian Navy ship names